Dae Jang Geum Is Watching is a 2018 South Korean television series starring Shin Dong-wook, Kwon Yu-ri, Lee Yul-eum, Kim Hyun-joon and Lee Min-hyuk, a work that started with the idea of how Dae Jang Geum's descendants would live. It aired on MBC's Thursdays at 23:10 (KST) time slot from October 11, 2018 to January 24, 2019.

Synopsis
The series follows the hectic lives, romantic relationships and love for food of three siblings—Han San-hae, Han Jin-mi and Han Jeong-sik.

Cast

Main
 Shin Dong-wook as Han San-hae (35 years old), the eldest of three siblings who works as a salesman.
 Kwon Yu-ri as Bok Seung-ah (28 years old), a newly recruited employee in the sales team at San-hae's company.
 Lee Yul-eum as Han Jin-mi (26 years old), San-hae and Jeong-sik's sister who has inherited a highly developed sense of smell.
 Kim Hyun-joon as Han Jeong-sik (26 years old), the youngest of the three siblings.
 Lee Min-hyuk as Min-hyuk (25 years old), a mysterious regular customer at a convenience store.

Supporting
 Jung Yi-rang as Lee Na-young
 Kim Kiri as Won Bin

Others
 Ki Do-hoon as a convenience store customer.
 Choi Jung-won as VIP's husband (Ep. 3)

Special and cameo appearances
 Lee Hye-jung as the mother of Han siblings
 Hyebin (Ep. 1)
 Daisy (Ep. 1)
 JooE (Ep. 1)
 Nancy (Ep. 1)
 Shownu (Ep. 9-10)
 Hong Jin-young (Ep. 9)
 Im Hyun-sik as Im Heon-sik (Ep. 16)
 Peniel Shin as Donggeuniel (Ep. 16)
 Jung Il-hoon as RoongD (Ep. 16)
 Yook Sung-jae as Oh Seong-jae (Ep. 16)

Ratings

References

External links
  
 
 

MBC TV television dramas
Korean-language television shows
2018 South Korean television series debuts
2019 South Korean television series endings
South Korean romance television series